Brady Anderson (born 12 June 1975) is a former Australian rules footballer who played for North Melbourne in the AFL.

Anderson started his career at East Perth where he was a Sandover Medalist in 1997 before being recruited by Geelong in 1995 and North Melbourne in the Pre-season draft. He made his debut in the opening round of the 1998 season against West Coast at the MCG. Anderson remained with North Melbourne for three seasons and finished with total AFL, VFL and WAFL games 170 games.

External links 
 

1975 births
East Perth Football Club players
Living people
North Melbourne Football Club players
Sandover Medal winners
Australian rules footballers from Western Australia